José María Justo Cos y Macho (6 August 1838 – 17 December 1919) was a Spanish Cardinal of the Roman Catholic Church who served as Archbishop of Valladolid from 1901 until his death, and was elevated to the cardinalate in 1911.

Biography
José Cos was born in Terán, Cabuérniga, Cantabria, and baptized in the parish of Santa Eulalia three days later, on 9 August 1838. He studied at the Jesuit School in Segura, Seminary of Monte Corbán in Santander, and the University of Salamanca, where he obtained his doctorate in theology. Cos was ordained to the priesthood in September 1862, and finished his studies in 1864. He taught at the Conciliar Seminary of Santander from 1862 to 1865, and became a canon magister of the Cathedral of Oviedo in 1865. He was named secretary to Bishop Sebastián Espinosa de los Monteros in 1882, and archdeacon of the cathedral chapter of Córdoba in 1884, which he later exchanged for the post of canon maestreescuela of the cathedral chapter of Oviedo.

On 10 June 1886 Cos was appointed Bishop of Mondoñedo by Pope Leo XIII. He received his episcopal consecration on the following 12 September from Archbishop Victoriano Guisasola y Rodríguez, with Bishops Ramón Martínez Vigil, OP, and José Mazarrasa y Rivas serving as co-consecrators, in the Cathedral of Oviedo. Cos was promoted to Archbishop of Santiago de Cuba on 14 February 1889 and served as a senator of the Spanish Kingdom from 1891 until his death. He was later named Bishop of Madrid-Alcalá (with the personal title of "Archbishop") on 11 June 1892, and Archbishop of Valladolid on 18 April 1901.

Pope Pius X created him Cardinal Priest of Santa Maria del Popolo in the consistory of 27 November 1911. Cos was one of the cardinal electors who participated in the 1914 papal conclave, which selected Pope Benedict XV. Between the death of Joaquín Beltrán y Asensio on 3 November 1917 and the appointment of Enrique Pla y Deniel on 4 December 1918, he served as Apostolic Administrator of Ávila.

Cardinal Cos died from bronchopneumonia in Valladolid, at the age of 81. He is buried in the metropolitan cathedral of Valladolid.

References

External links
Catholic-Hierarchy 
Cardinals of the Holy Roman Church

1838 births
1919 deaths
People from the Saja and Nansa Valleys
Clergy from Cantabria
20th-century Spanish cardinals
19th-century Roman Catholic archbishops in Spain
20th-century Roman Catholic archbishops in Spain
University of Salamanca alumni
Cardinals created by Pope Pius X
Roman Catholic archbishops of Santiago de Cuba